Aminata Konate (born 24 October 1990) is a French basketball player who plays for club Cavigal Nice of the League feminine de basket the top league of basketball for women in France.

References

French women's basketball players
1990 births
Basketball players from Paris
Living people